National Socialist Workers Party may refer to:

 National Socialist Workers' Party (Sweden)
 National Socialist German Workers Party
 National Socialist Workers' Party of Denmark
 German National Socialist Workers' Party (Czechoslovakia)
 Bulgarian National Socialist Workers Party
 National Socialist Dutch Workers Party
 Swedish National Socialist Farmers' and Workers' Party
 Iran National-Socialist Workers Party
 Hungarian National Socialist Party
 Austrian National Socialist Party
 Sudeten German Party